The Portrait of Sir Robert Shirley is a painting by Sir Anthony van Dyck, a Flemish Baroque artist. It is a portrait of Sir Robert Shirley (c. 1581 – 13 July 1628), the ambassador to the Safavid Shah Abbas (r. 1588–1629), beginning in 1608. This painting was completed in Rome in 1622 and is one of a pair; its pendant depicts Shirley's wife, Lady Teresa Sampsonia, a Circassian noblewoman. It is notable for the rich Persian dress worn by Shirley. Both of these paintings are now in the collection of Petworth House, in West Sussex.

Further reading
 Gary Schwartz, "The Shirleys and the Shah: Persia as the Stakes in a Rogues's Gambit," The fascination of Persia: The Persian-European dialogue in seventeenth-century art & contemporary art of Teheran, ed. Axel Langer, Zürich (Museum Rietberg) and Verlag Scheiddeger & Spiess 2013, pp. 78-99, 294-97, 300-20.

References

1620 paintings
Portraits by Anthony van Dyck
Portraits of men